Shahadat may refer to:

, a Bangladeshi cricketer
Shahadat Hussain, a Bengali poet and writer
Shahadat Hossain Khan, a Bangladeshi musician
Muhammad Shahdaat Bin Sayeed, a Bangladeshi young scientist
Shahada, also known as Kalema-tut-Shahadat
The Arabic term for martyrdom